(styled Kimi ni HITOMEBORE) is a single by Japanese boy band Sexy Zone. It was released on November 19, 2014. It debuted in number one on the weekly Oricon Singles Chart, selling 336,101 copies. It was the 18th best-selling single of the year in Japan, with 347,737 copies.

References 

2014 singles
2014 songs
Oricon Weekly number-one singles